Andrew John Waddell (born 16 May 1966) is a former Australian politician who was a member of the Legislative Assembly of Western Australia from 2008 to 2013.

References

1966 births
Living people
Members of the Western Australian Legislative Assembly
Australian Labor Party members of the Parliament of Western Australia
21st-century Australian politicians